The 1st constituency of the Tarn-et-Garonne (French: Première circonscription de Tarn-et-Garonne) is a French legislative constituency in Tarn-et-Garonne département.

Description

The 1st constituency of Tarn-et-Garonne is one of two in the department. This constituency covers its eastern half and includes the city of Montauban.

Over recent decades the political allegiance of this seats voters has fluctuated between left and right, in 2017 it was a rare exception to the national trend in that it reelected a Socialist Party incumbent in the face of opposition from En Marche!.

Deputies

Election results

2022

 
 
 
 
 
 
 
|-
| colspan="8" bgcolor="#E9E9E9"|
|-

2017

 
 
 
 
 
 
 
|-
| colspan="8" bgcolor="#E9E9E9"|
|-

2012

 
 
 
 
 
|-
| colspan="8" bgcolor="#E9E9E9"|
|-

2007

 
 
 
 
 
 
 
 
|-
| colspan="8" bgcolor="#E9E9E9"|
|-

2002

 
 
 
 
 
 
 
|-
| colspan="8" bgcolor="#E9E9E9"|
|-

1997

 
 
 
 
 
 
 
|-
| colspan="8" bgcolor="#E9E9E9"|
|-

References

1